Raphael Alves da Silva (born 1990 in  Brazil), also known as Raphael Alves, is a Brazilian professional footballer.

Club career

UES
In 2011 he signed with UES of the Salvadoran Primera División.

Return to UES
Da Silva signed again for UES in the Apertura 2015 tournament. However, with the scarlet team he barely played and left the team months later in the midst of a sports, economic and financial crisis.

References

External links
adsaocaetano.com.br

1990 births
Living people
Brazilian footballers
Brazilian expatriate footballers
Expatriate footballers in El Salvador
Expatriate footballers in Sweden
Expatriate footballers in Poland
Association football midfielders
Footballers from São Paulo